Keith Sinjohn Joseph, Baron Joseph,  (17 January 1918 – 10 December 1994), known as Sir Keith Joseph, 2nd Baronet, for most of his political life, was a British politician, intellectual and barrister.  A member of the Conservative Party, he served as a minister under four prime ministers: Harold Macmillan, Sir Alec Douglas-Home, Edward Heath and Margaret Thatcher. He was a key influence in the creation of what came to be known as  "Thatcherism".

Keith Joseph was the first to introduce the concept of the social market economy into Britain, an economic and social system inspired by Christian democracy. He also co-founded the Centre for Policy Studies writing its first publication: Why Britain needs a Social Market Economy.

Early life 
Joseph was born in Westminster, London, to a wealthy and influential family, the son of Edna Cicely (Phillips) and Samuel Joseph. His father headed the vast family construction and project-management company, Bovis, and was Lord Mayor of London in 1942–3. At the end of his term he was created a baronet. Joseph's family was Jewish.

On the death of his father on 4 October 1944, 26-year-old Keith inherited the baronetcy.

Education and academic career
Joseph was educated at Lockers Park School in Hemel Hempstead in Hertfordshire, followed by Harrow School, where, uncharacteristically, he did not do particularly well academically. He then attended Magdalen College, Oxford, where he read Jurisprudence, obtaining first class honours. He was elected a Prize Fellow of All Souls College in 1946.

Early career 
During World War II, Joseph served as a captain in the Royal Artillery, and suffered a minor wound during German shelling of his company's headquarters in Italy, as well as being Mentioned in dispatches. After the end of the war, he was called to the Bar (Middle Temple). Following his father, he was elected as an Alderman of the City of London. He was a Director of Bovis, becoming chairman in 1958, and became an underwriter at Lloyd's of London. In 1945, Joseph joined the leadership of the Post-War Orphans’ Committee of the Central British Fund for German Jewry (now World Jewish Relief).

Member of Parliament 

He failed to be elected to the marginal seat of Barons Court in West London by 125 votes in the 1955 election.

He was elected to parliament in a by-election for Leeds North East in February 1956. He was swiftly appointed as a Parliamentary Private Secretary.

In government 
Following 1959, Joseph had several junior posts in the Macmillan government at the Ministry of Housing and the Board of Trade. In the 'Night of the Long Knives' reshuffle of 13 July 1962 he was made Minister for Housing and Local Government. He introduced a massive programme to build council housing, which aimed at 400,000 new homes per year by 1965. He wished to increase the proportion of owner-occupied households, by offering help with mortgage deposits. Housing was an important issue at the 1964 election and Joseph was felt to have done well on television in the campaign.

Social Services 
In opposition, Joseph was spokesman on Social Services, and then on Labour under Edward Heath. He was one of twelve founder members of the National Council for the Single Woman and Her Dependants on 15 December 1965. 

According to Tim Cook's The History of the Carers' Movement, Joseph and Sally Oppenheim were critical in raising funds from the Carnegie Trust and other organisations, which enabled the carers movement to succeed and thrive through its formative years.

Trade spokesman 
Despite Joseph's reputation as a right-winger, Heath promoted him to Trade spokesman in 1967, where he had an important role in policy development. In the run-up to the 1970 election Joseph made a series of speeches under the title "civilised capitalism", in which he outlined his political philosophy and hinted of cuts in public spending. At the Selsdon Park Hotel meeting, the Conservative Party largely adopted this approach.

After the Conservatives won the election, Joseph was made Secretary of State for Social Services, which put him in charge of the largest bureaucracy of any government department but kept him out of control of economics. Despite his speeches against bureaucracy, Joseph found himself compelled to add to it as he increased and improved services in the National Health Service. However, he grew increasingly opposed to the Heath government's economic strategy, which had seen a 'U-turn' in favour of intervention in industry in 1972.

1974 
Following the election defeat of February 1974, Joseph worked with Margaret Thatcher to set up the Centre for Policy Studies, a think-tank to develop policies for the new free-market Conservatism that they both favoured. Joseph became interested in the economic theory of monetarism as formulated by Milton Friedman and persuaded Thatcher to support it.

Despite still being a member of Heath's Shadow Cabinet, Joseph was openly critical of his government's record.  In 1976, Joseph delivered his famous Stockton lecture on the economy Monetarism Is Not Enough in which he sought to discredit previously dominant Keynesian economic strategies and contrasted wealth-producing sectors in an economy, such as manufacturing, with the service sector and government, which tend to be wealth-consuming. He contended that an economy begins to decline as its wealth-producing sector shrinks.

Many on the right wing of the Conservative Party looked to Joseph to challenge Heath for the leadership, but his chances declined following a controversial speech on 19 October 1974. It covered a variety of socially-conservative topics and drew on an article that had been written by Arthur Wynn and his wife and published by the Child Poverty Action Group.

The notion of the "cycle of deprivation" holding down poor people was the basis of his speech. He linked it to current theories of the culture of poverty, especially to the chaotic lifestyle of the poorest people. However, he suggested that poor people should stop having so many children. In his highly publicised speech at Edgbaston, he reflected on the moral and spiritual state of Britain:

The outrage, despite his repeated apologies, in reaction to his speech sharply undercut Joseph's campaign to replace Heath as party leader. The speech was largely written by Jonathan Sumption, who went on to become a Supreme Court judge in United Kingdom, but the most controversial sentence was inserted by Joseph himself.

Thatcher 
Joseph withdrew from the contest against Heath and endorsed Thatcher. She had been eager to run but had backed Joseph.

He now became a major advisor. Thatcher later referred to Joseph as her closest political friend, and they both moved sharply to the right. His overnight conversion to free-market, small-government policies  "had the force of a religious conversion". In 1975, he said:

This remark expressed Joseph's sense of failure during multiple Conservative governments that had automatically followed the post-war consensus of a welfare state with strong labour unions. Their policies to stabilise the economy retained government control on industries and created an intricate system to control wages and dividends.  In the eyes of Thatcher and Joseph, that pragmatic approach was contrary to the true "Conservative" ideology. As he had done a great deal to promote Thatcher, when she won the leadership in 1975, she determined to put him in a position that would facilitate a profound influence on Conservative Party policy.

In Thatcher's Shadow cabinet, Joseph wanted to be Shadow Chancellor of the Exchequer, but that was impossible since his notorious 1974 speech. Instead, he was given overall responsibility for Policy and Research. He had a large impact on the Conservative manifesto for the 1979 election, but frequently, a compromise had to be reached with Heath's more moderate supporters, such as Jim Prior.

Thatcher named Joseph Secretary of State for Industry. He began to prepare the many nationalised industries for privatisation by bringing in private sector managers such as Ian MacGregor but was still forced to give large subsidies to those industries making losses.

Secretary of State for Education and Science 
As Thatcher's Secretary of State for Education from 1981 he started the ball rolling for GCSEs, and the establishment of a national curriculum in England and Wales. Mark Carlisle, his predecessor in the Conservative government in 1979, had cancelled the plans of Shirley Williams, his second-last predecessor, to merge O Levels and CSEs, but he achieved that policy. Although that was not normally the responsibility of central government, he insisted on personally approving the individual subject syllabuses before the GCSE system was introduced.

His attempts to reform teachers' pay and bring in new contracts were opposed by the trade unions and led to a series of one-day strikes.

In 1984, his public spending negotiations with his Treasury colleagues resulted in a proposed plan for extra research funding for universities financed through the curtailment of financial support to students who were dependent children of more affluent parents. That plan provoked heated opposition from fellow members of the Cabinet (particularly, Cecil Parkinson) and a compromise plan was found necessary to secure consensus. The compromise involved the abandonment of Joseph's plan to levy tuition fees but preserved his aspiration to abolish the minimum grant. The resulting loss to research funding was halved by a concession of further revenue by the Treasury team.

Joseph emerged unscathed from  the Brighton hotel bombing during the Conservative Party Conference in 1984.

In 1985, he published a White Paper on the university sector, The Development of Higher Education into the 1990s. It advocated an appraisal system to assess the relative quality of research and foresaw a retrenchment in the size of the higher education sector. Both proposals were controversial.

Joseph was the primary influence on the Education (No. 2) Act 1986, enacted soon after his resignation as secretary, which abolished corporal punishment in most schools, established regular parents' meetings, and increased parents' influence in school governance.

Backbenches, retirement and peerage 
Joseph stepped down from the Cabinet in 1986, and retired from Parliament at the 1987 election. He was appointed to the Order of the Companions of Honour in 1986.

He received a life peerage in the dissolution honours, being created Baron Joseph, of Portsoken in the City of London on 12 October 1987.

Joseph died on 10 December 1994.

30-year rule and official documents 
At the end of 2011, the release of confidential documents under the UK Government's 30-year rule revealed Joseph's thoughts regarding the Liverpool riots. In response to Michael Heseltine's regeneration proposal, Joseph suggested that there should be a "managed rundown" of Merseyside instead. Later, his private secretary asked for minutes of a meeting to be amended to remove reference to explicit economic regeneration as Joseph believed "it is by no means clear that any such strategy could lead to a viable economic entity".

Legacy
Joseph's speech Monetarism is Not Enough was described by Margaret Thatcher as "one of the very few speeches which have fundamentally affected a political generation's way of thinking."

Joseph's political achievement was in pioneering the application of monetarist economics to British political economics, and in developing what would later become known as 'Thatcherism'. He knew his own limitations, remarking of the prospect of his becoming Leader of the Conservative Party that "it would have been a disaster for the party, country, and me", and he rated himself a failure in office.

His political philosophy speeches were ridiculed by some at the time but they were profoundly influential within the Conservative Party and in practice set the tone for politics in the 1980s.

The Keith Joseph Memorial Lecture, held annually, is a testament to his legacy as the intellectual powerhouse of Thatcherism.

Accusation of paedophilia

In 2014, Anthony Gilberthorpe, a Tory activist and failed parliamentary candidate, accused Sir Keith Joseph of being present at parties where sexual abuse of underaged boys took place. Along with naming others in the Cabinet of the day, Mr Gilberthorpe accused Sir Keith Joseph of being a paedophile.

Personal life

Joseph was married twice: firstly, in 1951 to Hellen Guggenheimer, with whom he had four children. They separated in 1978, finally divorcing in 1985.  In 1990 he married Yolanda Sheriff (née Castro), whom he had known since the 1940s.

References

Sources 
 Denham, Andrew and Mark Garnett. Keith Joseph (Acumen, 2002)
 Halcrow, Morrison. Sir Keith Joseph: A Single Mind (1989)
 Harrison, Brian. "Mrs. Thatcher and the Intellectuals," Twentieth Century British History (1994) 5#2 pp 206–245.
 Harrison, Brian. "Joseph, Keith Sinjohn, Baron Joseph (1918–1994)", Oxford Dictionary of National Biography, Oxford University Press, 2004; online edn, May 2011 accessed 6 June 2013
 Moore, Charles. Margaret Thatcher: From Grantham to the Falklands (2013)
O'Connell, Jeffrey and Thomas E. O'Connell. "Global Raising and Razing of Statism: The Mirror Roles of Two Law-Trained Englishmen – William Beveridge and Keith Joseph," Journal of Law & Politics (2000) 16#3 pp 639–662.

External links 

 
 Joseph's speech at Edgbaston
 Excerpt from Commanding Heights by Daniel Yergin and Joseph Stanislaw
 Sir Keith Joseph papers in the Conservative Party Archive

|-

|-

|-

|-

|-

1918 births
1994 deaths
Alumni of Magdalen College, Oxford
Baronets in the Baronetage of the United Kingdom
British Army personnel of World War II
British Secretaries of State
British Secretaries of State for Education
Conservative Party (UK) MPs for English constituencies
Conservative Party (UK) life peers
Councilmen and Aldermen of the City of London
English Jews
Fellows of All Souls College, Oxford
Gluckstein family
Jewish British politicians
Members of the Order of the Companions of Honour
Members of the Privy Council of the United Kingdom
People educated at Lockers Park School
People educated at Harrow School
Royal Artillery officers
UK MPs 1955–1959
UK MPs 1959–1964
UK MPs 1964–1966
UK MPs 1966–1970
UK MPs 1970–1974
UK MPs 1974
UK MPs 1974–1979
UK MPs 1979–1983
UK MPs 1983–1987
Secretaries of State for Health and Social Services
Ministers in the Macmillan and Douglas-Home governments, 1957–1964
Member of the Mont Pelerin Society
Life peers created by Elizabeth II